Michael Haydn's Symphony No. 4 in B-flat major, Perger 51, Sherman 4, MH 62, was written in Salzburg, completed on December 7, 1763. Charles H. Sherman's modern edition of this work has been published by Musikverlag Doblinger and also appears in an anthology from Garland Publishing that includes symphonies by Anton Cajetan Adlgasser and Johann Ernst Eberlin, two other Salzburg composers.

Scored for 2 oboes, 2 bassoons, 2 horns, and strings, in three movements:

Allegro
Andante, in E-flat major, called "La Confidenza"
Allegro molto

Charles Sherman finds the first movement "noteworthy for the length of its development section (nearly equal in number of measures to the exposition and to the recapitulation) and for the persistence with which it treats a motive derived" from the main theme. Another unusual feature of the first movement is that it ends piano, something rare even in the following century (for example, Beethoven's Eighth and Bruckner's Eighth).

Scholars are not sure why the second movement is called "La Confidenza" ("the secret communication"). The horns are dismissed for this slow movement, but the two bassoons stay and are given independent parts.

Discography

As part of the Bournemouth Sinfonietta complete series of Haydn's symphonies conducted by Harold Farberman, an LP containing Symphony No. 13 (misidentified as Symphony No. 14) coupled with Haydn's Symphony No. 4 was released in 1984 on Vox Cum Laude – D-VCL 9086.

References

 A. Delarte, "A Quick Overview Of The Instrumental Music Of Michael Haydn" Bob's Poetry Magazine November 2006: 36 PDF
 Charles H. Sherman and T. Donley Thomas, Johann Michael Haydn (1737 - 1806), a chronological thematic catalogue of his works. Stuyvesant, New York: Pendragon Press (1993)

Symphony 04
Compositions in D major
1763 compositions